USS LST-993 was an  in the United States Navy. Like many of her class, she was not named and is properly referred to by her hull designation.

LST-993 was laid down on 7 March 1944 at the Boston Navy Yard; launched on 7 April 1944; sponsored by Mrs. Gladys L. Morey; and commissioned on 12 May 1944.

Service history

Service in United States Navy 
During World War II, LST-993 was assigned to the Asiatic-Pacific theater and participated in the following operations:
Leyte landings — November 1944
Lingayen Gulf landings — January 1945
Tarakan Island operation — April and May 1945

Following the war, LST-993 performed occupation duty in the Far East and saw service in China until early June 1946. She was decommissioned on 1 June 1946. On 7 February 1948, the ship was transferred to the Republic of China. She was struck from the Navy list on 12 March 1948.

LST-993 earned three battle stars for World War II service.

Service in Republic of China Navy 
On 14 August 1954, ROCS Chun Shun ran aground in the waters of the Nanji Islands in Zhejiang Province and her hull was seriously damaged. It was finally decided to abandon the ship and was scrapped on 31 December of the same year. In 1955, her name and pennant number was taken over by another LST. The second ship is ROCS Chung Shun, this makes her the second ship with the same name that has been in service so far.

Notes

References

 

LST-542-class tank landing ships
World War II amphibious warfare vessels of the United States
Ships built in Boston
1944 ships
LST-542-class tank landing ships of the Republic of China Navy